Graphis is a genus of lichenized fungi in the family Graphidaceae.

Distribution
It has a cosmopolitan distribution, which includes most continents across the world. This includes Florida in  North America.

Species
As accepted by Species Fungorum;

Graphis alba 
Graphis albidofarinacea 
Graphis albissima 
Graphis albocarpa 
Graphis alboglaucescens 
Graphis alboscripta 
Graphis allugallenensis 
Graphis alpestris 
Graphis amaliana 
Graphis analoga 
Graphis andamanica 
Graphis anfractuosa 
Graphis apertella 
Graphis aphaneomicrospora 
Graphis aphanes 
Graphis apoda 
Graphis appendiculata 
Graphis arbusculiformis 
Graphis archeri 
Graphis argentea 
Graphis australosiamensis 
Graphis awasthii 
Graphis balaghatensis 
Graphis bernadetiae 
Graphis bipartita 
Graphis boliviana 
Graphis borealis 
Graphis brahmanensis 
Graphis breussii 
Graphis brevicarpa 
Graphis brittoniae 
Graphis bungartzii 
Graphis cambodiensis 

Graphis caribica 
Graphis carmenelisana 
Graphis catherinae 
Graphis centrifuga 
Graphis chondroplaca 
Graphis cincta 

Graphis cinnamomea 
Graphis coenensis 
Graphis colliculoides 
Graphis collinsiae 
Graphis consociata 
Graphis crassilabra 
Graphis crebra
Graphis cremicolor 
Graphis crocea 
Graphis crystallifera 
Graphis cupei 
Graphis cycadicola 
Graphis darjeelingensis 

Graphis dendrogramma
Graphis descissa 
Graphis desquamescens 
Graphis dichotoma 
Graphis discarpa 
Graphis dispersa 
Graphis distincta 
Graphis dracaenae 
Graphis duplicata 
Graphis duplicatoinspersa 
Graphis eburnea 
Graphis eimeoensis 
Graphis elegans 
Graphis elevata 

Graphis emersa 
Graphis emersella 
Graphis endoxantha 
Graphis enteroleuca 
Graphis epimelaeana 
Graphis evirescens 
Graphis ferrugineodisca 
Graphis filiformis 
Graphis fissurinoides 
Graphis flavopalmicola 
Graphis flavovirens 
Graphis flosculifera 
Graphis fulvescens 
Graphis galactoderma 
Graphis gloriosensis 
Graphis gonimica 
Graphis guangdongensis 
Graphis halonata 
Graphis hatschbachii 
Graphis hinnulea 
Graphis hodgesiana 
Graphis hongkongensis 
Graphis hunanensis 
Graphis hyphosa 
Graphis hypocrellina 
Graphis immersella 
Graphis immersicans 
Graphis implicata 
Graphis inamoena 
Graphis indica 
Graphis inopinata 
Graphis inspersolongula 
Graphis insulana 
Graphis insularis 
Graphis inustuloides 

Graphis isidiza 

Graphis japonica 
Graphis jeanmuelleri 
Graphis jejuensis 
Graphis jinhuana 
Graphis kakaduensis 
Graphis kavintuca 
Graphis khaojoneana 
Graphis khaoyaiensis 

Graphis kollaimalaiensis 
Graphis koltermaniae 
Graphis koratensis 
Graphis koreana 
Graphis kousyuensis 
Graphis kurokawae 
Graphis leptaleocarpa 
Graphis leptocarpa 
Graphis leptocarpoides 
Graphis leptoclada 
Graphis leptotremoides 
Graphis librata 
Graphis lindsayana 
Graphis lineola 
Graphis litoralis 
Graphis lueckingiana 
Graphis lueckingii 
Graphis luluensis 

Graphis lurizana 
Graphis lutea 

Graphis maharashtrana 
Graphis manipurensis 
Graphis maomingensis 
Graphis maritima 
Graphis marusae 
Graphis medusula 
Graphis meghalayensis 
Graphis mellis-insulae 

Graphis microsperma 
Graphis mikuraensis 
Graphis mucronata
Graphis murali-elegans 
Graphis muscicola 
Graphis myrtacea 
Graphis neeladriensis 
Graphis negrosina 
Graphis neoelongata 
Graphis neoraensis 
Graphis nerurensis 
Graphis nigririmis 
Graphis nigrocarpa 
Graphis nigroglobosa 
Graphis nilgiriensis 
Graphis nitida 
Graphis norfolkensis 
Graphis norsorediata 
Graphis norstictica 
Graphis nudanorsticta 
Graphis omiana 
Graphis palmicola 
Graphis pananensis 
Graphis panhalensis 
Graphis paradisserpens 
Graphis paradussii 
Graphis paralleloides 
Graphis paranaensis 
Graphis paraschiffneri 
Graphis paraserpens 

Graphis pernambucoradians 
Graphis persulcata 
Graphis pertricosa 
Graphis plumbeidisca 
Graphis propinqua 
Graphis pseudoserpens 
Graphis pseudosophistica
Graphis puiggarii 
Graphis pustulosa 
Graphis pyrrhocheiloides
Graphis rajapakshana 
Graphis ramosa 
Graphis rimosothallina 
Graphis riopiedrensis 
Graphis robertusii 
Graphis rondoniana 
Graphis rongklaensis 
Graphis rosae-emiliae 
Graphis rosalbinana 
Graphis salacinilongiramea 
Graphis santanderiana 

Graphis saxicola 

Graphis schummiana 
Graphis scripta 
Graphis seawardii 
Graphis semiaperta 
Graphis sirohiensis 
Graphis sitapurensis 
Graphis slendrae 
Graphis solmariana 
Graphis srilankensis 
Graphis stellata 
Graphis stenospora 
Graphis stenotera 
Graphis stipitata 
Graphis streimannii 
Graphis subalbostriata 
Graphis subaltamirensis 
Graphis subargentata 
Graphis subcontorta 
Graphis subcupei 
Graphis subelongata 
Graphis subfiliformis 
Graphis subhiascens 

Graphis subinsulana 
Graphis subintermedians 
Graphis sublitoralis 
Graphis submarginata 
Graphis subregularis 
Graphis subschroederi 

Graphis subtecta 
Graphis subtenella 
Graphis subvittata 
Graphis sulphurella 
Graphis sundarbanensis 

Graphis supracola 
Graphis suzanae 
Graphis syzygii 
Graphis taneina 
Graphis tenella 
Graphis tenoriensis 
Graphis tenuirima 
Graphis tetracarbonisata 
Graphis tetralocularis 
Graphis thunsinhalayensis 
Graphis tetralocularis
Graphis treubii 
Graphis tricolor 
Graphis turgidula 
Graphis valparaiensis 
Graphis vermifera 
Graphis verrucata 
Graphis verruciformis 
Graphis verrucoserpens 

Graphis vinosa 

Graphis xylophaga 
Graphis yunnanensis

References

 
Lichen genera
Taxa described in 1763
Ostropales genera
Taxa named by Michel Adanson